The 1981–82 Honduran Liga Nacional season was the 16th edition of the Honduran Liga Nacional.  The format of the tournament remained the same as the previous season.  C.D.S. Vida won the title after defeating Atlético Morazán in the finals and qualified to the 1982 CONCACAF Champions' Cup.  Additionally, Vida, Atlético Morazán, C.D. Marathón and Real C.D. España obtained berths to the 1982 Copa Fraternidad.

1981–82 teams

 Atlético Morazán (Tegucigalpa)
 Broncos (Choluteca)
 Independiente (San Pedro Sula, promoted)
 Marathón (San Pedro Sula)
 Motagua (Tegucigalpa)
 Olimpia (Tegucigalpa)
 Platense (Puerto Cortés)
 Real España (San Pedro Sula)
 Universidad (Tegucigalpa)
 Victoria (La Ceiba)
 Vida (La Ceiba)

Regular season

Standings

Final round

Pentagonal standings

Replay

 Vida won Replay and advanced to the Final.

Final

 Vida won 4–1 on aggregated score.

Top scorer
  Luis O. Altamirano (Broncos) with 15 goals

Squads

Trivia
 There was a total of 405 goals this season, a record still unbeaten.

Known results

Week 1

Week 2

Week 3

Week 4

Week 5

Week 6

Week 7

Week 29

Pentagonal

Regular season

Unknown rounds

References

Liga Nacional de Fútbol Profesional de Honduras seasons
1981–82 in Honduran football
Honduras
Honduras